Saint Jude's Infirmary are a Scottish indie band originally from Fife but now based in Edinburgh. Fans of the band include Ian Rankin and Jack Vettriano both of whom appear on the band's second album This Has Been the Death of Us released on 19 October 2009, on the 7th Realm of Teenage Heaven label. Their first critically acclaimed album Happy Healthy Lucky Month was released on 7 May 2007 on the Edinburgh label SL Records. The album included a song Goodbye Jack Vettriano a video for which was later commissioned by BBC Scotland's The Music show. Filmed on Portobello beach in Edinburgh it features a cameo appearance from Jack Vettriano and references two of his most famous paintings Elegy for a Dead Admiral and The Singing Butler. The lyrics were written by bass player Grant Campbell while he was living abroad and feeling homesick saw a Vettriano print on a Rotterdam pub wall.

Inspired by the song Jack Vettriano painted a self-portrait which went on to become the cover of the second album. Goodbye Jack Vettriano also features as a bonus track on This Has Been the Death of Us .

Discography
Happy Healthy Lucky Month (2007), SL
This Has Been the Death of Us (2009), 7th Realm of Teenage Heaven

References

External links

Scottish rock music groups